Macabre is a quality of some artistic or literary works characterized by a grim or ghastly atmosphere or a heavy emphasis on gruesome portrayals of death.

Macabre may also refer to:

Literature:
 Macabre (short fiction and poetry journal), edited and published by Connecticut poet/author, Joseph Payne Brennan, New Haven, CT, Twenty-three (23) issues, I - XXIII, 1957–1976

Films:
 Macabre (1958 film), a thriller directed by William Castle
 Macabre (1980 film), a horror thriller directed by Lamberto Bava
 Macabre (2009 film), an Indonesian horror/slasher film

In music:
 Macabre (album), by Dir en grey
 Macabre (band), a metal band
 Pentagram (band), previously known as Macabre, an American heavy metal band

See also
 Danse Macabre (disambiguation)